Henry Thomas Stanley (20 August 1873 – 16 September 1900) was an English cricketer who played 63 first-class matches for Somerset County Cricket Club and the Marylebone Cricket Club (MCC) between 1894 and 1899. He was the older son of the wealthy Edward Stanley MP and heir to the Quantock Lodge Estate in Somerset. He gained the rank of Lieutenant in the service of the West Somerset Yeoman Cavalry, and was killed in action during the Second Boer War, at Hekpoort, South Africa in 1900. 

An account of his death and burial in South Africa is given in A Yeoman's Letters by P. T. Ross. He has a large granite memorial cross in the churchyard at Over Stowey, Somerset, inscribed:NOT HERE HE LIES NOT HERE
BUT FAR AWAY IN OTHER EARTHBY OTHER GRASS OERSPREADYET BY HIS HOMETHIS CROSS SHALL STAND & SAYHE LIVES AMONG HIS OWN

References

External links
 
A Yeoman's Letters, by P. T. Ross at The Project Gutenberg

1873 births
1900 deaths
English cricketers
Marylebone Cricket Club cricketers
Somerset cricketers
British military personnel killed in the Second Boer War
West Somerset Yeomanry officers
A. Priestley's XI cricketers
Oxford University Past and Present cricketers
People educated at Eton College
Military personnel from London
British Army personnel of the Second Boer War